Era is the fourth studio album by American rock band Disappears. It was released in August 2013 under Kranky.

Track listing

References

2013 albums
Kranky albums